Dragan Đorđević (born 1970 in Niš) was the presidential candidate in the 2004 Serbian presidential election for the Party of Serbian Citizens. He graduated from Niš Law School.

References

1970 births
Living people
Candidates for President of Serbia
Politicians from Niš
Date of birth missing (living people)
University of Niš alumni
21st-century Serbian politicians